Stranda is a municipality in Møre og Romsdal county, Norway. It is part of the Sunnmøre region. The administrative centre of the municipality is the village of Stranda. Stranda consists of three smaller villages and one larger central village. The smaller villages are Hellesylt, Geiranger, and Liabygda. The central village, Stranda (same name as the municipality), has about 2,600 inhabitants. Stranda Municipality is known for tourist attractions like the Geirangerfjorden Sunnylvsfjorden and its skiarea at Strandafjellet

The  municipality is the 134th largest by area out of the 356 municipalities in Norway. Stranda is the 192nd most populous municipality in Norway with a population of 4,467.

General information
The parish of Stranden was established as a municipality on 1 January 1838 (see formannskapsdistrikt law). On 1 January 1892, the northern district of the municipality (population: 850) was separated to form the new Stordal Municipality. This left Stranda with 1,459 residents. The spelling was changed to Stranda in 1918. During the 1960s, there were many municipal mergers across Norway due to the work of the Schei Committee. On 1 January 1965, Sunnylven Municipality (population: 1,221) was merged into Stranda, forming a new, larger Stranda Municipality.

Name
The Old Norse form of the name was Strǫnd. The name is identical with the word strǫnd which means "beach" or "strand". Before 1918, the name was written Stranden.

Coat of arms
The coat of arms was granted on 2 May 1986 and were designed by Jarle Skuseth. The arms show a gold and blue figure which symbolizes the fjords and mountains hovering over the beach.

Churches
The Church of Norway has four parishes within the municipality of Stranda. It is part of the Austre Sunnmøre prosti (deanery) in the Diocese of Møre.

Geography

The West Norwegian Fjords, entailing Geirangerfjord and Nærøyfjord was inscribed on UNESCO's World Heritage List in 2005 at the 29th Session of the World Heritage Committee in Durban, South Africa. The West Norwegian Fjords is the first natural World Heritage site in Norway, and the third natural site in the Nordic – Baltic region.

The West Norwegian Fjords are characterised as the best geologically developed and preserved example of classic fjord landscape. The geology and ongoing erosional processes have provided a basis for the active development of ecological and biological processes as well as the development of traditional, in part extreme, land use that has not harmed the integrity of the natural site.

Due to its natural environment, this scenic area is one of the most visited in the Nordic countries. The area has examples of landforms shaped and developed by ice and water, a landscape with significant geomorphological features, and a very young landscape in terms of Earth history that is continuously being formed by active erosional processes. The area represents the most extreme and dramatic fjord landscape in the world and has an exceptional aesthetic importance.

The Seven Sisters waterfall is located along the Geirangerfjord. The mountain Dalsnibba and the lake Djupvatnet are located along Norwegian County Road 63 in the southern part of the municipality. The mountains of Kvitegga and Hornindalsrokken lie on the southern municipal border.

Government
All municipalities in Norway, including Stranda, are responsible for primary education (through 10th grade), outpatient health services, senior citizen services, unemployment and other social services, zoning, economic development, and municipal roads. The municipality is governed by a municipal council of elected representatives, which in turn elect a mayor.  The municipality falls under the Møre og Romsdal District Court and the Frostating Court of Appeal.

Municipal council
The municipal council of Stranda is made up of 25 representatives that are elected to four year terms. The party breakdown of the council is as follows:

Mayor
The mayors of Stranda (incomplete list):
2011–present: Jan Ove Tryggestad (Sp)
2003-2011: Frank Sve (FrP)
1999-2003: Inge Gjærde (H)
1992-1999: Anne Lise Lunde (KrF)
1988-1992: Inge Gjærde (H)

Tourism

Tourism has long and strong traditions in Stranda. The villages of Geiranger and Hellesylt have long been well-known destinations. The first cruise ship with tourists from abroad came to Geiranger in 1869. Today, Geiranger is the second largest cruise ship port in Norway, visited by 160 cruise ships every summer. The Coastal Steamer (Hurtigruten) runs daily round trips Ålesund-Geiranger from April to mid-September. Altogether about 700,000 tourists visit Geiranger each summer.

Royal persons, especially Queen Sonja, have contributed to make the fjord famous all over the world. By annual trips, visiting, and even spending the night on these abandoned mountains farms such as Skageflå, and publishing a book about these trips with her own photos that have also been exhibited in New York, among other places. Other historic farms include Knivsflå and Me-Åkernes.

Sports and leisure
In the alpine area at Strandafjellet, there are six Ski tows and alpine pistes. Each winter alpine competitions are hosted there. Strandafjellet is one of the few places in the world where one could actually ski from the top of a mountain and go the whole way down, to the fjord. The Geiranger – From Fjord to Summit race runs from Geiranger to Dalsnibba each year.

Culture
In Hellesylt, one may visit Hægstad Gård which contains woodcarvings, scenes from Peer Gynt by Henrik Ibsen, and in Geiranger the new Norwegian Fjord Centre shows local history and pictures from Geiranger.

Trade and industry
The municipality of Stranda has a great variety as to trade and industry. About 160 farms produce milk and meat products. Many factories have long traditions for making meat products, especially salted and cured meat. Also the making of furniture and textile products is an important industry that gives good work to many persons. Stranda is the place where P.I. Langlo industrialized the furniture industry in Norway in 1919. (There is almost no unemployment in the area). The Grandiosa factory, Norway's biggest pizza-producing factory is situated in Stranda. There are also much aquafarming and many fish processing factories in the municipality. Tourism is, of course, a very important business in the whole district.

In popular culture
Released in March 2016, "The Wave (Bølgen)" is a Norwegian disaster movie based on the premise of a rock slide from the mountain Åkerneset inundating the town of Geiranger.

Notable residents

 Olaf Skavlan (1838–1891) a Norwegian literary historian and playwright
 Aadel Lampe (1857-1944) a Norwegian women's rights leader, liberal politician, teacher for deaf children and suffragist
 Olav Berntsen Oksvik (1887–1958) politician and County Governor of Møre og Romsdal
 P.I. Langlo, (Norwegian Wiki) (1892–1940), pioneered the industrial manufacture of furniture
 Eiliv Odde Hauge (1913–1971) a military officer, screenwriter, author, museum director and Norwegian resistance movement member
 Asbjørn Gjærde (born 1939) journalist, worked for NRK for 43 years
 Peter Opsvik (born 1939) furniture designer and jazz saxophonist
 Kjell A. Storeide (born 1952) a Norwegian businessperson, CEO of Stokke Gruppen 1990-2004
 Pål Øie, (Norwegian Wiki) (born 1961) a Norwegian film director 
 Arve Henriksen (born 1968) a Norwegian trumpeter
 Are Kalvø (born 1969) a Norwegian writer and satirist
 Margreth Olin (born 1970) a Norwegian film director, film producer and screenwriter 
 Bjarne Solbakken (born 1977) alpine skier, competed in the 2002 and 2006 Winter Olympics
 Øyvind Skarbø (born 1982) a Norwegian drummer and composer

See also
 Norwegian Colony, a Norwegian community in California established by families from Stranda.

References

External links
Municipal fact sheet from Statistics Norway 
West Norwegian Fjords UNESCO World Heritage Site 
Storfjordens Venner 
Strandafjellet downhill skiing
Visit Geiranger
Norwegian Fjord Centre
Destinasjon Geirangerfjord – Trollstigen
Local information and news 
Sunnmøringen local newspaper 
Map

 
Municipalities of Møre og Romsdal
1838 establishments in Norway